Fulton County is a county located in the U.S. state of Indiana.  , the population was 20,836.  The county seat is Rochester.

History 

The first non-Native Americans to ever set foot in what is now Fulton County, Indiana ,were French traders. Few of them remained permanently as year-round residents of the area and by the 1830s there was no French population in what is now Fulton County.

In the 1820s and 1830s, migrants from New England began moving to what is now Indiana in large numbers (though there was a trickle of New England settlers who arrived before this date). These were “Yankee” settlers, that is to say they were descended from the English Puritans who settled New England during the colonial era. While most of them came to Indiana directly from New England, there were many who came from upstate New York. These were people whose parents had moved from New England to upstate New York in the immediate aftermath of the American Revolution. Due to the prevalence of New Englanders and New England transplants from upstate New York, the northern third of Indiana was very culturally contiguous with early New England culture for much of its early history.

The Yankee migration to Indiana was a result of several factors, one of which was the overpopulation of New England. The old stock Yankee population had large families, often bearing up to ten children in one household. Most people were expected to have their own piece of land to farm, and due to the massive and nonstop population boom, land in New England became scarce as every son claimed his own farmstead. As a result, there was not enough land for every family to have a self-sustaining farm, and Yankee settlers began leaving New England for the Midwestern United States.

They were aided in this effort by the construction and completion of the Erie Canal which made traveling to the region much easier, causing an additional surge in migrants coming from New England. Added to this was the end of the Black Hawk War, which made the region much safer to travel through and settle in for White settlers.

In the case of Fulton County, there were no attempts by United States settlers to permanently settle the area until the conclusion of the Blackhawk War. Fulton County's first permanent non-Native American settlers arrived in September and October 1832, most of whom came from New England though some of whom were New England transplants from upstate New York. Most of Fulton County's New England settlers came from Franklin County, Massachusetts, Grafton County, New Hampshire and Orange County, Vermont, as well as several farming families from Maine and the rural northern region of Connecticut. At first, virtually all of these settlers were farmers.

These settlers were primarily members of the Congregational Church, though due to the Second Great Awakening, many of them had converted to Methodism, and some had become Baptists before coming to what is now Cook County. The Congregational Church has subsequently gone through many divisions, and some factions, including those in Cook County, are now known as the Church of Christ and the United Church of Christ.

When the New Englanders arrived, there was nothing but dense virgin forest and wild prairie. They laid out farms, constructed roads, erected government buildings and established post routes.  By the spring of 1833 the settlement was a successful and thriving farming community. Rochester was laid out in 1835. The founder Alexander Chamberlain named it for his former hometown of Rochester, New York. The Rochester post office was established in 1836.

Fulton County was formed in 1836. It was named for Robert Fulton, inventor of the steamboat. Native Americans in the county believed that a terrible monster lived in Lake Manitou and for that reason they never lived around the lake. Early settlers called it the Devil's Lake and there were many reported sightings of a monster.

The Potawatomi Trail of Death came through the town in 1838.

The 178-acre Moore Farm, then located two miles south of Rochester, was purchased in 1871 for use as the Fulton County Poor Farm. The County Home was closed on 31 December 1965 and the entire property was sold on 17 December 1966 by the county commissioners to State Senator Robert E. Peterson of Rochester.

Geography 

Cities and towns 
 Akron
 Athens
 Delong
 Fulton
 Grass Creek
 Kewanna
 Leiters Ford
 Rochester
 Tiosa

Townships 
 Aubbeenaubbee
 Henry
 Liberty
 Newcastle
 Richland
 Rochester
 Union
 Wayne

Major highways
  U.S. Route 31
  State Road 14
  State Road 17
  State Road 19
  State Road 25
  State Road 114

Railroads 
 Fulton County Railroad

Adjacent counties
 Marshall County  (north)
 Kosciusko County  (northeast)
 Wabash County  (east)
 Miami County  (southeast)
 Cass County  (south)
 Pulaski County (west)
 Starke County (northwest)

Climate and weather 

Government

The county government is a constitutional body, and is granted specific powers by the Constitution of Indiana, and by the Indiana Code.

County Council: The county council is the legislative branch of the county government and controls all the spending and revenue collection in the county. Representatives are elected from county districts. The council members serve four-year terms. They are responsible for setting salaries, the annual budget, and special spending. The council also has limited authority to impose local taxes, in the form of an income and property tax that is subject to state level approval, excise taxes, and service taxes.

Board of Commissioners: The executive body of the county is made of a board of commissioners. The commissioners are elected county-wide, in staggered terms, and each serves a four-year term. One of the commissioners, typically the most senior, serves as president. The commissioners are charged with executing the acts legislated by the council, collecting revenue, and managing the day-to-day functions of the county government.

Court: The county maintains a small claims court that can handle some civil cases. The judge on the court is elected to a term of four years and must be a member of the Indiana Bar Association. The judge is assisted by a constable who is also elected to a four-year term. In some cases, court decisions can be appealed to the state level circuit court.

County Officials: The county has several other elected offices, including sheriff, coroner, auditor, treasurer, recorder, surveyor, and circuit court clerk. Each of these elected officers serves a term of four years and oversees a different part of county government. Members elected to county government positions are required to declare party affiliations and to be residents of the county.

Fulton County is part of Indiana's 2nd congressional district and in 2015 was represented by Jackie Walorski in the United States Congress.  It is also part of Indiana Senate district 18; and Indiana House of Representatives districts 16 and 23.

After a stretch of very narrow Democratic Party victories in the last four presidential elections of the 19th century, Fulton County became & has remained a Republican Party stronghold in presidential elections. The only exceptions to this have been Woodrow Wilson's plurality in 1912 thanks to a divided Republican vote & Franklin D. Roosevelts narrow majority in 1936 in the midst of his national landslide victory.

Demographics 

As of the 2010 United States Census, there were 20,836 people, 8,237 households, and 5,736 families residing in the county. The racial makeup of the county was 95.0% white, 0.7% black or African American, 0.5% Asian, 0.5% American Indian, 2.2% from other races, and 1.1% from two or more races. Those of Hispanic or Latino origin made up 4.2% of the population. In terms of ancestry, 28.7% were German, 19.0% were American, 10.9% were Irish, and 10.0% were English. Those citing "American" ancestry in Fulton County are of overwhelmingly English extraction, however most English Americans identify simply as having American ancestry because their roots have been in North America for so long, in some cases since the 1600s.

Of the 8,237 households, 32.2% had children under the age of 18 living with them, 54.2% were married couples living together, 10.2% had a female householder with no husband present, 30.4% were non-families, and 25.8% of all households were made up of individuals. The average household size was 2.50 and the average family size was 2.97. The median age was 40.3 years.

The median income for a household in the county was $47,697 and the median income for a family was $47,972. Males had a median income of $40,110 versus $28,417 for females. The per capita income for the county was $21,119. About 8.5% of families and 11.3% of the population were below the poverty line, including 15.1% of those under age 18 and 6.9% of those age 65 or over.

2020 census
As of the 2020 United States Census the population of Fulton County was 20,480.

Education 
Public schools in Fulton County are administered by the Caston School Corporation, the Rochester Community School Corporation, Culver Community School Corporation, and the Tippecanoe Valley School Corporation.

High Schools and Middle Schools
 Caston Junior-Senior High School
 Rochester Community High School
 Rochester Middle School
 Tippecanoe Valley High School
 Tippecanoe Valley Middle School

Elementary Schools
 Akron Elementary
 Caston Elementary School
 Columbia Elementary School
 Riddle Elementary School

See also 
 National Register of Historic Places listings in Fulton County, Indiana

References

External links 
 Caston School Corporation
 Rochester Community School Corporation
 Tippecanoe Valley School Corporation

 
Indiana counties
1836 establishments in Indiana
Populated places established in 1836
Sundown towns in Indiana